Wolfgang  Henzler (born 5 April 1975) is a former German Porsche factory racing driver. He began racing in 1991 with a win in the German Junior Kart championship.

Born in Nürtingen, Baden-Württemberg, he won one time the 24 Hours of Le Mans in 2010 in the GTE PRO category.

His last major championship win was in the GT class of the 2013 Petit Le Mans.

Wolf Henzler resides in Braselton, Georgia in the United States.

Racing record

Complete International Formula 3000 results
(key) (Races in bold indicate pole position; races in italics indicate fastest lap.)

24 Hours of Le Mans results

Complete WeatherTech SportsCar Championship results
(key) (Races in bold indicate pole position; results in italics indicate fastest lap)

References

External links

1975 births
Living people
People from Nürtingen
Sportspeople from Stuttgart (region)
German racing drivers
American Le Mans Series drivers
Rolex Sports Car Series drivers
International Formula 3000 drivers
24 Hours of Le Mans drivers
24 Hours of Daytona drivers
European Le Mans Series drivers
Racing drivers from Baden-Württemberg
Porsche Supercup drivers
FIA World Endurance Championship drivers
WeatherTech SportsCar Championship drivers
24 Hours of Spa drivers
Asian Le Mans Series drivers
24H Series drivers
GT World Challenge America drivers

Porsche Motorsports drivers
KCMG drivers
Josef Kaufmann Racing drivers
Durango drivers
Walker Racing drivers
Nürburgring 24 Hours drivers
Le Mans Cup drivers
Porsche Carrera Cup Germany drivers